HD 23005, also known as HR 1124, is a soltiary, yellowish-white hued star located in the northern circumpolar constellation Camelopardalis, the giraffe. It has an apparent magnitude of 5.78, making it faintly visible to the naked eye. At its current distance, HD 23005's brightness is diminished by 0.15 magnitudes due to extinction from interstellar dust. It has an absolute magnitude of +2.07.

The star has been given several stellar classifications over the years. It has been given a luminosity class of a subgiant (IV), a blend of a subgiant and main sequence star (IV/V), and a class intermediate between a bright giant and a regular giant star (II-III). Most sources generally agree that it is an early F-type star.

HD 23005's newest spectral class is F1 IVnn, which indicates that it is an evolved F-type subgiant with very broad absorption features due to rapid rotation. HD 23005 has an iron abundance 141% that of the Sun's and is estimated to be 1.1 billion years old. A 2016 variable star survey identified HD 23005 as a candidate γ Doradus variable.

References

F-type subgiants
Camelopardalis (constellation)
BD+66 00284
023005
017585
1124